Avsenik Brothers Ensemble were a Slovene Oberkrainer music band formed by the brothers Slavko Avsenik and Vilko Avsenik in 1953 in Begunje na Gorenjskem. The music for their repertoire of about 1000 songs was all written by Slavko and arranged by Vilko, an academic composer. Lyrics for their songs were written by Marjan Stare, Ferry Souvan, Ivan Sivec, Franc Košir, Tone Fornezzi, Vinko Šimek and others.

The band changed the name several times. They started as a trio, then formed a quartet and finally formed a quintet with two or three singers. They were and remain particularly popular in Austria, Germany, Switzerland and the Slovene diaspora over the world. The band invented the Oberkrainer music, a new music genre of volksmusik and sold over 32 million records, which makes them the best selling Slovene music artists ever. They performed over 10,000 concerts all over the world, three times in the Berlin Philharmonic. Their biggest hit Na Golici (Trompeten-Echo), written by Slavko Avsenik and released in 1955, is according to some the most played instrumental piece of music in history. The band disbanded in 1990 due to Slavko's problems with his spine.

Discography

Singles

References

External links

official page at avsenik.com

Musical groups established in 1953
Musical groups disestablished in 1990
Folk music groups
Slovenian musical groups